This article provides the names of the runners-up in the Miss Universe pageant since the pageant's first edition in 1952.

Table of Miss Universe runner-up and finalists
The pageant has awarded the five remaining finalists from 1952 to 1989, 2001 to 2014 and 2020 with the first, second, third and fourth Runner-Up being awarded. From 1990 to 1997 and 2016, the number of finalists was increased to six. From 1998 to 2000 and 2015, 2017 to 2019 and 2021, it was reverted to five but only up to the second runner-up was awarded (regardless if the pageant post-announces the placements of the other 2 delegates who made it to the Top 5).

This table shows the top-five finalists of each competition, from its inception in 1952.

Countries/Territories by number of finalists

1st Runner-Up
The first Runner-Up of each edition of Miss Universe is the second placer behind the candidate who is crowned as Miss Universe (first placer). In some cases, she shall take over the title of Miss Universe, if:
 The outgoing titleholder cannot fulfill her duties. This could happen and may result to resignation, giving up the title, or dethronement
 The titleholder is dethroned due to deeds that violate the organization's policies. This has only happened in 2002.

There were instances that the winner is not replaced by the first Runner-Up, when she decides to voluntarily resign from her position, given the formal permission from the organization (1952 and 1974).

This table lists the number of 1st Runner-Up titles by country. There are some special considerations:
 Hawaii competed as an independent territory from 1952 to 1959, before it joined the United States, holding one 1st Runner-Up title on its own.
 The United Kingdom (currently competing under the name of Great Britain) competed separately as England (from 1955 to 1962 and then again from 1964 to 1990), Scotland (from 1961 to 1986 and then again from 1988 to 1990) and Wales (from 1961 to 1990), holding a total of four 1st Runner-Up titles which are counted together.
 As Panama took over the Miss Universe title in 2002, it is unknown if the 1st Runner-Up position was taken by another candidate after the succession took place.

The current 1st Runner-Up is Amanda Dudamel from Venezuela, as for the edition that took place on January 14, 2023 in New Orleans, Louisiana.

2nd Runner-Up
The second Runner-Up of each edition of Miss Universe is the third placer behind the candidate who is crowned as Miss Universe (first placer) and the first Runner-Up (second placer).
Although it has never happened, the second Runner-Up is supposed to take over the Miss Universe title if both the original winner and the first Runner-Up are unable to fulfill their duties/resign their titles. For example, if a Miss Universe winner is required to give up her title and the first Runner-Up is unable/does not want to assume the winner's position, the title then passes to the second Runner-Up.

This table lists the number of 2nd Runner-Up titles by country. There are some special considerations as well:
 Hawaii competed as an independent territory from 1952 to 1959, before it joined the United States, holding one 2nd Runner-Up title on its own.
 The United Kingdom (currently competing under the name of Great Britain) competed separately as England (from 1955 to 1962 and then again from 1964 to 1990), Scotland (from 1961 to 1986 and then again from 1988 to 1990) and Wales (from 1961 to 1990), holding a total of five 2nd Runner-Up titles which are counted together.
 It is unknown if Zhuo Ling, Miss Universe 2002 second Runner-Up, took over the first Runner-Up position after Justine Pasek took over the winner's place, as no official statements regarding this matter were made by the organization.

The current 2nd Runner-Up is Andreína Martínez from Dominican Republic , as for the edition that took place on January 14, 2023 in New Orleans, Louisiana.

Notes
 Now known as 
 Now known as 
 The results of Miss USSR were inherited by Miss Russia.

3rd Runner-Up 
The third Runner-Up of each edition of Miss Universe is the fourth placer behind the candidate who is crowned as Miss Universe (first placer), the first Runner-Up (second placer) and the second Runner-Up (third placer).

4th Runner-Up 
The fourth Runner-Up of each edition of Miss Universe is the fifth placer behind the candidate who is crowned as Miss Universe (first placer), the first Runner-Up (second placer), the second Runner-Up (third placer) and the third Runner-Up (fourth placer).

Miss Universe runners-up and finalists table position

See also 
 List of Miss Universe titleholders
 List of Miss Earth elemental queens
 List of Miss International runners-up and finalists
 List of Miss World runners-up and finalists
 Big Four international beauty pageants

References

Miss Universe Runners-up

Miss Universe Runners-up